Louise was a  sidewheel passenger steamer that operated on the Chesapeake Bay for 40 years.

It operated from Pier 15 at Light Street in Baltimore, Maryland and served destinations including Tolchester Beach, Maryland.

References

Culture of Baltimore
Passenger ships of the United States
Steamboats of the United States
Paddle steamers